Pune District Central Cooperative Bank is a major state government public sector bank in Pune district. The establishment is a capital shares around the region.

History
The Co-Operative Societies Act led to the foundation of the PDCC on September 4, 1917. The establishment started with manager and clerk only with  51,000 capital.

References

Cooperative banks of India
Banks established in 1917
Indian companies established in 1917
Banks based in Kerala
Financial services companies based in Pune